Ketaki Mategaonkar is an Indian singer,  songwriter, actress, and performer. She was born in Nagpur, Maharashtra. Mategaonkar mainly appears in Marathi Cinema and Hindi Album Songs. She made her big-screen debut with Shala (2011) film.

Family
She is the daughter of Parag Mategaonkar and Suvarna Mategaonkar who are a musical family. Parag is music director and Suvarna is a singer.

Filmography

Feature films

Music videos

Television

Playback singing

Awards

References

External links
 
 
 
 

Indian film actresses
Actresses in Marathi cinema
Actresses in Hindi cinema
Living people
Musicians from Nagpur
1994 births
Marathi playback singers
Bollywood playback singers
Singers from Maharashtra
Actresses from Nagpur
21st-century Indian actresses
Women musicians from Maharashtra
21st-century women musicians